Puduḫepa or Pudu-Kheba (fl. 13th century BC) was a Hittite queen, married to the King Hattusili III. She has been referred to as "one of the most influential women known from the Ancient Near East."

Biography

Early life and marriage 
Puduḫepa was born at the beginning of the 13th century BC in the city of Lawazantiya in Kizzuwatna (i.e. Cilicia, a region south of the Hittite kingdom). Her father Bentepsharri was the head priest of the tutelary divinity of the city, Shaushka (identified with the Mesopotamian Ishtar), and Puduḫepa grew up to exercise the function of priestess of this same goddess.

On his return from the Battle of Kadesh, the Hittite general Hattusili met Puduḫepa and, it was said, Ishtar instructed him to find in her love and companionship, decreeing that they would enjoy the 'love of being a spouse to each other.' She accompanied him then to the kingdom of Hapissa. For Puduḫepa it was an advantageous match. Although Hattusili was most likely much older than her and already had numerous lovers and concubines, Puduḫepa became first among them all. When her spouse successfully rose to the Hittite throne by defeating his nephew Mursili III in a civil war instigated by Hattusili around 1286 BC, Puduḫepa ascended the throne with him, becoming tawananna, or queen.

Reign 

Puduḫepa had an important role in the Hittite court and international diplomacy of the period. She would appear constantly by the side of her spouse as he made his rulings and decisions. It appears, however, that she was portrayed reigning hand in hand with her spouse rather than subservient to the king. Puduḫepa had the use of her own seal, controlled the domestic arrangements of the royal palaces, and judged court cases. Blending religion and politics, she reorganized the vast pantheon of Hittite deities.

From the royal palace in the newly rebuilt capital city of Hattusa, Puduḫepa used her sons and daughters to ensure Hittite ascendancy and to cement alliances. This was a role that had never been performed by a Hittite queen before.

She played an important role in diplomacy with Ancient Egypt. Extensive correspondence bearing Puduḫepa's seal survives, communicating several times with the king of Egypt Ramesses II as he signed a peace treaty with Hattusili, in which Hattusili agrees that two of his daughters should go to Egypt to marry Ramesses.

A diplomatic marriage between King Kadashman-Enlil II of Babylonia may have been in the offing with Puduḫepa matchmaking Kadashman-Enlil’s betrothal to one of her daughters.

A princess of Babylon was married into the Hittite royal family. This would have been a daughter or sister of King Kudur-Enlil and the news elicited contempt from Ramesses II, who apparently no longer regarded Babylon as politically significant. Puduḫepa replied in a letter, ‘If you say "The king of Babylon is not a Great King," then you do not know the status of Babylon.’

After the death of Hattusili, the role of Puduḫepa expanded under the reign of her son Tudhaliya IV, under the title of goddess-queen. She was involved in judicial matters to the point of intervening in legal cases. She was also a priestess who worked on organising and rationalising Hittite religion.

Her daughters were Queen Maathorneferure of Egypt and Princess Kiluš-Ḫepa.

Nefertari and Puduḫepa

Queen Nefertari of Egypt sent gifts to Puduḫepa:
The great Queen Naptera (Nefertari) of the land of Egypt speaks thus: ʻSpeak to my sister Puduḫepa, the Great Queen of the Hatti land. I, your sister, (also) be well!! May your country be well. Now, I have learned that you, my sister, have written to me asking after my health. You have written to me because of the good friendship and brotherly relationship between your brother, the king of Egypt, The Great and the Storm God will bring about peace, and he will make the brotherly relationship between the Egyptian king, the Great King, and his brother, the Hatti King, the Great King, last for ever... See, I have sent you a gift, in order to greet you, my sister... for your neck (a necklace) of pure gold, composed of 12 bands and weighing 88 shekels, coloured linen maklalu-material, for one royal dress for the king... A total of 12 linen garments.’Kitchen, Kenneth A., Pharaoh Triumphant: The Life and Times of Ramesses II, The King of Egypt, Aris & Phillips. 1983

See also 

Nineteenth Dynasty of Egypt family tree
Arnuwanda III, grandson of Puduḫepa

Sources

Further reading 
Gold, C. (2015). Women who ruled: History's 50 most remarkable women.

External links 
 Queen Puduḫepa

Ancient priestesses
Hittite queens
13th-century BC women
13th-century BC clergy
Queen mothers
Ancient women rulers